The Bloom House is a historic house at North Maple and Academy Streets in Searcy, Arkansas.  It is a -story fieldstone structure, with a hip roof and two forward-facing projecting gable sections flanking its entrance.  Its roof is finished in green tile, and a single brick chimney rises at the rear of the house. Built about 1930, it is a fine local example of the third stage of Craftsman styling executed in stone in the area.

The house was listed on the National Register of Historic Places in 1991.

See also
National Register of Historic Places listings in White County, Arkansas

References

Houses on the National Register of Historic Places in Arkansas
Houses completed in 1930
Houses in Searcy, Arkansas
National Register of Historic Places in Searcy, Arkansas
1930 establishments in Arkansas
American Craftsman architecture in Arkansas
Bungalow architecture in Arkansas